Tada Keelalay (born January 4, 1984) is a former professional footballer born in Thailand. He had made several appearances for the Thailand national football team, including one qualifying match for the 2006 FIFA World Cup.

Honours

International
Thailand U-23
 SEA Games:  Gold medal 2003, 2005

Asian Champions League Appearances

References

External links

1984 births
Living people
Tada Keelalay
Tada Keelalay
2004 AFC Asian Cup players
Footballers at the 2006 Asian Games
Tada Keelalay
Southeast Asian Games medalists in football
Association football defenders
Competitors at the 2003 Southeast Asian Games
Competitors at the 2005 Southeast Asian Games
Tada Keelalay
Tada Keelalay
Tada Keelalay
Tada Keelalay
Tada Keelalay
Tada Keelalay
Tada Keelalay
Tada Keelalay